The Ferrovia Asciano–Monte Antico (Asciano–Monte Antico railway) is a railway line linking the town of Asciano to Monte Antico in the municipality of Civitella Paganico in Southern Tuscany.

History 
The line was planned in 1859 and constructed by the Società per le Strade Ferrate Romane as the first line to connect the cities of Siena and Grosseto. The section between Asciano and Torrenieri was the first to open, which it did in 1865. The next section, between Torrenieri and Monte Amiata, opened in 1871, and the rest was completed for 1872, when the line connecting to Grosseto opened. In 1906 a plan was submitted to construct a faster line between Monte Antico and Siena and this new line was completed in 1927. The services between Asciano and Monte Antico continued to operate as well as this line. In 1955, both lines came under the operation of the FS. During the Second World War, the line was extensively damaged. The first section to be rebuilt was from Asciano to San Giovanni d'Asso, the rest reopening only in 1952. In 1966, a flood washed away part of the line between Monte Amiata and Torrenieri stations, and the line remained closed until 1980 during which period various modernisation work took place. The line via Buonconvento was also damaged and also remained closed until 1980. In 1994 the passenger uptake of the line had dwindled to a point that the government found unsustainable, and the line closed to regular passenger services. In 1996 the Treno Natura tourist heritage services began to operate on select days of the year, using historic steam and diesel locomotives and railcars. This continues nowadays.

Gallery

See also 
 List of railway lines in Italy

References 

Railway lines in Tuscany
Railway lines opened in 1872